The Joint Warfare Centre (JWC) is a NATO establishment headquartered in Stavanger, Norway.

It was established at Jåttå on 23 October 2003 as a subordinate command of Headquarters Supreme Allied Commander Transformation (HQ SACT). The purpose of this was to have a command with responsibility for training and exercise of the NATO headquarters. The old Joint Headquarters North (JHQ NORTH) was abolished and command transferred to the Allied Command Transformation (ACT) in Norfolk, Virginia, USA.

Mission

The JWC provides NATO's training focal point for full spectrum joint operational level warfare.

The mission of the Joint Warfare Centre is to:
 Provide operational level joint training in support of ongoing operations;
 Conduct and supports collective training of joint and combined staffs of the NATO Command Structure (NCS) and NATO Force Structure (NFS) for Major Joint Operations (MJOs) and Small Joint Operations (SJOs), integrating NATO members' national capacities, regional security organizations' initiatives and Partnership for Peace (PfP);
 Provide key leader training capability;
 Support adherence to joint operational warfare doctrine and standards;
 Assist the developmental and experimental work of Allied Command Transformation on new concepts, technologies, modeling and simulation;
 Performs joint analysis, collects lessons learned and feeds them back into the transformational network through the Joint Analysis and Lessons Learned Centre.

Commanders and Directors
The Commanders and Directors of the Joint Warfare Centre:

References

External links 
 

Joint Warfare
Organisations based in Stavanger
NATO installations in Norway